Carl Neracher Morris is a professor in the Statistics Department of Harvard University and spent several years as a researcher for the RAND Corporation working on the RAND Health Insurance Experiment.

Early life
Carl Morris had received his BS in Aeronautical Engineering from the California Institute of Technology in 1960 and then attended Indiana University until 1962. He obtained his Ph.D. in statistics from Stanford University under advisor Charles Stein in 1966.

Since 1990, Morris has been at Harvard Statistics Department and Harvard Medical School Department of Health Care Policy. He served as the chair of the Harvard Statistics Department from 1994 to 2000.

Morris has also been a professor at the University of California, Santa Cruz, Frederick S. Pardee RAND Graduate School, Stanford University, and the University of Texas at Austin where he served as Director of the Center for Statistical Sciences.

Morris is a Fellow of the American Statistical Association, Institute of Mathematical Statistics, and Royal Statistical Society, and an elected member of ISI. Morris was an editor of both the Theory and Methods, the Journal of the American Statistical Association (1983–1985) and Statistical Science (1989–1991).

Morris is best known for his work on natural exponential families with quadratic variance functions (NEF-QVF), a theory which classifies the most common statistical distributions. Morris is also well known for his work in sports statistics.

References
MathSciNet reference
Statistics Department homepage 
"Natural Exponential Families with Quadratic Variance Functions," Breakthroughs in Statistics, 1997, (3), 374-394.  Reprinted from Annals of Statistics (1982).

Living people
American statisticians
Year of birth missing (living people)
California Institute of Technology alumni
Indiana University alumni
Stanford University alumni
Harvard University faculty
Stanford University faculty
University of California, Santa Cruz faculty
University of Texas at Austin faculty
Fellows of the American Statistical Association
RAND Corporation people